Tabibb is an Iranian talk show program dedicated to health notices and prevention, hosting specialists in various fields of medicine every day. This program is performed by Peyman Talebi and the producer and director of this program is Ali Zahedi.

Program format 
Tabibb program, with the aim of providing medical knowledge and public education to the audience, will be broadcast live on IRIB TV3 from 15 December 2016 until now. The program is conversational and during the program, viewers' questions are asked directly to the guest doctor.

Title sequence singer 
At first, Behnam Safavi was the singer of the title track of Tabibb program And now Garsha Rezaei is the singer of the first title sequence of this program.

References 

Iranian television shows
2010s Iranian television series